
Gmina Drobin is an urban-rural gmina (administrative district) in Płock County, Masovian Voivodeship, in east-central Poland.

Villages
Apart from the town of Drobin, Gmina Drobin contains the villages and settlements of Biskupice, Borowo, Brelki, Brzechowo, Budkowo, Chudzynek, Chudzyno, Cieśle, Cieszewko, Cieszewo, Dobrosielice Drugie, Dobrosielice Pierwsze, Dziewanowo, Karsy, Kłaki, Kowalewo, Kozłówko, Kozłowo, Krajkowo, Kuchary, Łęg Kościelny, Łęg Probostwo, Małachowo, Maliszewko, Mlice-Kostery, Mogielnica, Mogielnica-Kolonia, Nagórki Dobrskie, Nagórki-Olszyny, Niemczewo, Nowa Wieś, Psary, Rogotwórsk, Setropie, Siemienie, Sokolniki, Stanisławowo, Świerczyn, Świerczyn-Bęchy, Świerczynek, Tupadły, Warszewka, Wilkęsy and Wrogocin.

Neighbouring gminas
Gmina Drobin is bordered by the gminas of Bielsk, Raciąż, Staroźreby and Zawidz.

References
Polish official population figures 2006

Drobin
Płock County

zh:德羅賓